Annaëlle Deshayes (born 16 March 1996) is a French rugby union player. She plays for the France women's national rugby union team and Lyon Olympique Universitaire
as a prop forward.

Career
In 2017 she left Caen for Rouen. In 2020 he joined Lyon Olympique Universitaire.

She was named in France's team for the delayed 2021 Rugby World Cup in New Zealand.

References

 1996 births
Living people
French female rugby union players